John Goodwin may refer to:

Politicians
John Goodwin (Parliamentarian) (1603–1674), Member of Parliament for Reigate
John B. Goodwin (1850–1921), Mayor of Atlanta, Georgia in the late 1880s
John Noble Goodwin (1824–1887), 1st Governor of Arizona Territory and U.S. Representative from Maine
John Goodwin (British Army officer) (1871–1960), British Army officer and Governor of Queensland
John A. Goodwin (1824–1884), U.S. educator, journalist and politician

Religion
John Goodwin (preacher) (1594–1665), English preacher and religious writer
John W. Goodwin (1869–1945), General Superintendent of the Church of the Nazarene

Others
 Jackie Goodwin (1920–1995), English footballer with Brentford
J. Cheever Goodwin (1850–1912), American musical theatre librettist, lyricist and producer
John B. L. Goodwin (1912–1994), American author and poet 
John Goodwin (archeologist) (1900 - 1959), founder of the discipline of archaeology in South Africa
John Goodwin (author) (born 1878), pen name of Sidney Floyd Gowing, novels such as The House of Marney adapted for film,l 
John Goodwin (canoeist) (born 1943), British slalom canoeist 
 John Goodwin (footballer) (1887–1954), Scottish footballer with Rangers and Ayr United 
John Goodwin (ice hockey) (born 1961), Emms Family Award winner and coach 
John Goodwin (mason), Boston mason involved in the Salem witch trials
John Goodwin (sport shooter) (1859–1938), British Olympic sports shooter 
John Goodwin (theatre publicist) (1921–2018), theatre publicist, writer and editor 
John Magnin Goodwin, songwriter and composer, collaborated with Amy Holland and Bernie Chiaravalle
John Thomas Hill Goodwin (1865–1950), Australian surveyor and public servant

See also
Jack Godwin (1904–1973), English rowing coxswain and magician
John Goodwin Lyman (1886–1967), American-born Canadian modernist painter
John Goodwin Tower (1925–1991), United States senator from Texas
John Godwin (disambiguation)
Jon Goodwin (disambiguation)
Jonathan Goodwin (disambiguation)